The Sanjivani Group of Institutes, is an educational institute in India which is located in Kopargaon, Ahmednagar district, Maharashtra state, India. It is composed of various schools and colleges.

History
Hon’ble Shri. Shankarrao Genuji Kolhe Saheb is Chairman of the Sanjivani Group of Institutes and established Sanjivani Group of Institutes in the year 1982. 

Then Chief Minister of Maharashtra, Padmabhooshan Late Shri Vasantraodada Patil realised the gravity of the problem in respect of acute shortage of engineers, decided to permit voluntary organizations to start Engineering Colleges and Polytechnics on "No Grant" basis and urged them to take an initiative in this regard.

Hon’ble Shri. Shankarrao Genuji Kolhe Saheb, Chairman, Sanjivani (Takali) Sahakari Sakhar Karkhana Ltd. & Ex-Minister for Transport, State Excise and Urban Land Ceiling, Govt. of Maharashtra responded to this appeal, and obtained permission from Govt. for Engineering College (Courses - Civil, Mechanical, Electronics Computer Engg.) and K.B.P. Polytechnic at Kopargaon in the academic year 1982-83 on "No Grant" basis under Sanjivani Group of Institutes, which has been registered as a Public Trust.

Educational Institutes under Sanjivani Group

Sanjivani K.B.P.Polytechnic

This Polytechnic is the first institute established by the Sanjivani Rural Education Society, Kopargaon in the year 1982.
It offers Three Years (1O+ level) Diploma courses in Engineering and Technology in the branches of Civil, Computer Technology, Electronics and Tele-Communication, Information Technology Mechanical Engineering and Electrical Engineering.

Sanjivani College of Engineering

Sanjivani College of Engineering is one of the Autonomous colleges under the University of Pune (Savitribai Phule Pune University), it is graded "A" by the National Board of Accreditation (NBA) and operates under ISO 9001:2008 standards.

The college is one among the technical institutes in Maharashtra state in the un-aided sector.  Which was established in the year 1983 by the Sanjivani Group of Institutes.

Sanjivani MBA

Sanjivani Group of Institute’s College of Engineering started its MBA Programme from the academic year 2010-11 with the objective management education to the rural masses. This is a two years full-time MBA programme approved by AICTE New Delhi & Affiliated to University of Pune. For Sanjivani MBA has made collaboration with University of Lethbridge.

Sanjivani Pharmacy

Sanjivani Sai Baba College of Education (B.Ed.) & Sanjivani Diploma in Education (D.T.Ed.)

Sanjivani Arts, Commerce & Science College 

The Sanjivani Arts, commerce and Science College is a new venture under taken by the Sanjivani Group of Institutes. It is an affiliated with University of Pune, located on the Nagar-Manmad highway at Kopargaon.

Sanjivani Junior College 

Sanjivani Junior College, Kopargaon is a self-financed college. Established in 2014.

Sanjivani International School, Kharghar, Navi Mumbai

Sanjivani International School was founded in 2005 by Hon’ble Shri Shankarrao Genuji Kolhe with the motto “Education for Enrichment, Enhancement and Excel lance”.
Shri Shankarrao Genuji Kolhe is the founder, Chairman of Sanjivani Group of Institutes which was established in 1982.

Sanjivani Academy A CBSE School

The Sanjivani Academy is a new venture under taken by the Sanjivani Group of Institutions. It is a co-educational CBSE School located on the Nagar-Manmad highway at Kopargaon.

Sanjivani Sainiki School & Junior College

Sanjivani Rural Education Society is established in 1982-1983 under the leadership of Hon. Ex. Minister Shri. Shankarraoji Kolhe Saheb. The main aim of the institute is to provide education to the students of all categories in the society. The Society runs College of Engineering, Polytechnic, ITI, Pre Cadet training Centre, B. Pharmacy, D. Pharmacy, B.Ed. College, D.T.Ed., M.B.A., Ashram School, Sanjivani Academy-A CBSE School etc. It is always said that, “NDA is in Maharashtra but Maharashtra is not in NDA is not in NDA”. Sticking up to this Quotation, Hon. Shri. S.G. Kolhe realized the seriousness of the acute shortage of Military Officers in Defence services from Maharashtra. Considering this, Sanjivani Rural Education Society runs the institute. Maharashtra Govt. has permitted to start Sanjivani Sainiki School on 1 August 2000.

References

1982 establishments in Maharashtra
Education in Ahmednagar district
Educational organisations in Maharashtra